The Monmouth Beach Stakes is an American Thoroughbred horse race run annually at Monmouth Park Racetrack in Oceanport, New Jersey.

Raced near the end of May, it is open to fillies and mares, age three and older. It is contested on dirt at a distance of one mile and seventy yards. Weights are assigned at 117 lbs. for three-year-olds and at 124 lbs for older horses, plus specific allowances. It currently offers a purse of $70,000.

The Monmouth Beach Stakes has been raced at various distances, recently at one mile in 2002 and 2007, 11/16 miles in 2003, 2004 and 1⅛ miles in 2005.

Past winners include the Canadian Horse Racing Hall of Fame inductee Wilderness Song who won in 1993.

Winners of the Monmouth Beach Stakes since 2000

References
 Monmouth Park Racetrack
 The Monmouth Beach Stakes at Pedigree Query

Ungraded stakes races in the United States
Open mile category horse races
1992 establishments in New Jersey
Monmouth Park Racetrack
Horse races in New Jersey
Recurring sporting events established in 1992